Cromwell is a 1970 British historical drama film written and directed by Ken Hughes. It is based on the life of Oliver Cromwell, who rose to lead the Parliamentary forces during the later parts of the English Civil War and, as Lord Protector, ruled Great Britain and Ireland in the 1650s. It features an ensemble cast, led by Richard Harris as Cromwell and Alec Guinness as King Charles I, with Robert Morley as Edward Montagu, 2nd Earl of Manchester and Timothy Dalton as Prince Rupert of the Rhine.

The film received two Oscar nominations during the 43rd Academy Awards held in 1971, winning one for Best Costume Design by Vittorio Nino Novarese, but losing another for Best Original Score, composed by Frank Cordell which echoed Walton (battle scenes) and Copland (everything else). It was also nominated for a BAFTA Award for Best Costume Design and a Golden Globe Award for Best Original Score. At the 7th Moscow International Film Festival in 1971 it won the award for Best Actor (Richard Harris), and was nominated for the Golden Prize as Best Picture (Ken Hughes). The film received negative reviews for its many historical inaccuracies; however, much praise went to the acting (particularly Harris and Guinness), the score, and the costume design.

Plot
Oliver Cromwell is a devout Puritan, a country squire, magistrate and former Member of Parliament. King Charles I's policies, including the enclosing of common land for the use of wealthy landowners and the introduction of "Romish" rituals into the Church of England, have become increasingly grating to many, including Cromwell. In fact, Charles regards himself as a devout Anglican, though permitting his French Queen to practise Roman Catholicism in private and forbidding her to bring up the young Prince of Wales in that faith. Cromwell plans to take his family to the New World, but, on the eve of their departure, he is persuaded to stay and resume a role in politics.

Charles has unenthusiastically summoned Parliament for the first time in twelve years, as he needs money to fight wars against both the Scots and the Irish. Although to appease the Commons he agrees to execute his belligerent adviser, the Earl of Strafford, Parliament will still not grant his requests unless he agrees to reforms that could lead to a constitutional monarchy. Committed to belief in the divine right of kings, and under pressure from his queen to stand firm, Charles refuses. When he enters the parliamentary chamber with an armed guard and attempts to arrest five members of Parliament [of which in reality Cromwell was not one], war breaks out in England, with those who side with Parliament arming against the King's supporters, both parties convinced that God is on their side.

When the Parliamentary forces in which Cromwell is a cavalry officer prove ineffective at the Battle of Edgehill, he, along with Sir Thomas Fairfax, sets up the New Model Army that eventually turns the tide against the king's forces. The army's discipline and training secure victory at the Battle of Naseby against superior numbers and Cromwell's cavalry proves to be the deciding factor, though one of his sons is killed in battle. The king is eventually encircled in his headquarters at Oxford and has his fervent supporter and nephew, Prince Rupert of the Rhine, banished after he fails to hold the port of Bristol. He is finally defeated in a second conflict after attempting to negotiate for help from Catholic nations with the help of the queen and his eldest son, who are sent abroad for this purpose.

Cromwell later hears from Sir Edward Hyde, the king's once-loyal adviser, of Charles' secret plans to raise a wholly Catholic army to support him, obstinately refusing to give in to the demands of Cromwell and his associates for a system of government in which Parliament will have as much say in the running of the country as the king. Cromwell therefore uses Parliament to have Charles tried for treason. At the resulting trial, which takes place in the Parliament building, the king refuses to recognise any authority higher than his own, but is found guilty and sentenced to death. After a farewell to his younger children, he faces execution bravely and even his most ardent critics are moved by his dignity and the fact that he has forgiven his captors. There is little celebration or satisfaction over his death, even on Cromwell's part.

In fact Cromwell has retired moodily to his estate and reacts with anger to a request from his radical colleague Henry Ireton to become king himself. However, Parliament soon proves self-serving in governing the country until, like the late king, Cromwell is forced to undertake a coup d'etat. Whereas Charles failed, Cromwell succeeds: his troops remove the MPs from the House of Commons, leaving Cromwell sitting symbolically alone in the Chamber as virtual dictator, where he outlines to the viewer his vision for The Protectorate. The film ends with a voice-over stating that Cromwell served very successfully for five years as Lord Protector before Charles I's son returned as king of an England "never to be the same again".

Cast
 Richard Harris as Oliver Cromwell
 Alec Guinness as King Charles
 Robert Morley as the Earl of Manchester: a commander of the Parliamentary forces.
 Dorothy Tutin as Queen Henrietta Maria
 Frank Finlay as John Carter
 Timothy Dalton as Prince Rupert
 Patrick Wymark as the Earl of Strafford
 Patrick Magee as Hugh Peters: a preacher.
 Nigel Stock as Sir Edward Hyde
 Charles Gray as the Earl of Essex, Lord General of Parliament's Army
 Michael Jayston as Henry Ireton
 Douglas Wilmer as Thomas Fairfax
 Geoffrey Keen as John Pym
 Stratford Johns as the judge and President of the Court during the king's trial
 Ian McCulloch as John Hampden
 Patrick O'Connell as John Lilburne: an English political Leveller
 Anna Cropper as John Carter's wife
 Jack Gwillim as General Byron: a Royalist supporter
 Anthony May as Richard Cromwell
 Stacy Dorning as Mary Cromwell: daughter of Oliver Cromwell
 Zena Walker as Elizabeth Cromwell: wife of Oliver Cromwell 
 John Welsh as Bishop Juxon, who attends Charles I at his execution
 Robin Stewart as Charles, Prince of Wales

Production
In 1960, Hughes read John Buchan's biography, Oliver Cromwell and more books before touring England and researching from historic sites to museums and archives.  In September 1960, Warwick purchased the screen rights to Buchan's book and Hughes was announced as writer and director. During the next few years, it was reported Peter Finch and Tony Hancock were under consideration for the title role before Richard Harris was finally cast in 1968.

Hughes originally wrote the script in 1961. Richard Harris liked it and wanted to star but financiers did not consider him a big enough star at the time to finance the film. They wanted Charlton Heston but Hughes did not think he was appropriate. (Heston wrote in his diaries on 2 November 1961 that he turned down "Warwick's Cromwell script.")

In April 1967, Irving Allen announced that John Briley had rewritten Ken Hughes' script and that Peter Hall was going to direct. Allen hoped to get Paul Scofield to play Charles I and Albert Finney to play Cromwell. Columbia were going to finance with filming to take place the following year. Hughes had tried to get Richard Burton to read the script but Burton was not interested. Hughes later said he almost succeeded in making the film in 1968 but finance fell through at the last minute.

In February 1969, it was announced Hughes would write and direct for Irving Allen. In April, it was reported Ronald Harwood was working on the script with Ken Hughes. Hughes eventually succeeded in raising the money from Columbia in the US. After $600,000 had been spent they were tempted to pull out but changed their mind. The budget started at $6 million and grew to $9 million.

Most of the film was shot in England, and London's Parliament Square was constructed at Shepperton Studios, but the battle scenes were shot in Spain. The original cut went for three hours fifteen minutes but Hughes cut it down to two hours twenty four minutes. "I think it's the best thing I've ever done," said Hughes in 1970.

Historical points
Although publicity for the film boasted that it had been made "after ten years of research", the film has been criticised for its historical inaccuracies. In its defence, George MacDonald Fraser has written, "Inevitably there are historical queries all the way through, as there are bound to be in a picture which takes its subject seriously and tries to cover so much in less than two and a half hours. The main thrust of Cromwell is true, it gets a great deal of history, and the sense of history, right". Costumes, locations (e.g. the layout of the House of Commons) and the appearance of actors were generally accurate but as in many historical films – as much as for practical film making purposes as anything else – liberties were taken with the course of events.

Release

Home media 
Cromwell was released in 2017 on Blu-ray in Germany and 2020 in France. Still not released on Blu-ray in the US, UK or other English speaking countries, but available digitally on online platforms, e.g. Amazon and iTunes.

Reception

Critical
The film was generally received unfavourably, with criticism of the historical inaccuracies; however the performances of its two leads, production values and score were praised.

FilmInk said the film "does have some good things about it: Alec Guinness is superb as Charles I, and the production design is amazing. But it's dull. So dull. Every time Richard Harris walks on screen he looks as though he's about to give a speech and he does."

Box-office
The film was one of the most popular movies in 1970 at the British box-office.

Awards and nominations

See also
 List of American films of 1970

References

External links
 
 
 

1970s historical drama films
1970s biographical drama films
British biographical drama films
British historical drama films
British epic films
1970s English-language films
English Civil War films
Films about capital punishment
Cultural depictions of Oliver Cromwell
Films set in London
Films set in Oxford
Films that won the Best Costume Design Academy Award
Columbia Pictures films
Films directed by Ken Hughes
Epic films based on actual events
Historical epic films
Richard Cromwell
1970 drama films
Films shot in England
Films shot in Spain
Films about royalty
Cultural depictions of Charles I of England
1970s British films
Henrietta Maria